Hey Rube: Blood Sport, the Bush Doctrine, and the Downward Spiral of Dumbness is a book written by Hunter S. Thompson, consisting of 83 articles split into three parts.  The articles were first published on ESPN.com's Page 2 under Thompson’s column Hey Rube. First published in mid-2004, the book contains articles from November 20, 2000, to October 13, 2003. It is sub-titled, Modern History from the Sports Desk.

This was the final book Thompson published before his death in February 2005.

Synopsis 
Most of the columns were written primarily as sports commentary, but tend to branch into other subjects—commonly politics and social commentary—either due to a perceived relevance to the sports news, or as a result of Thompson's natural discursive tendencies. Some articles are focused on subjects entirely outside sports, such as "Fear and Loathing in America" and "Love Blooms in the Rockies", which deal with the 9/11 attacks and Thompson's marriage, respectively.

Thompson also chimes in on world events at the time of writing the articles. He voices his distaste for the 2000 presidential election, promotes warning as he writes through September 11, and tells of his crusade to free Lisl Auman, who had been sentenced to 20 years in prison in connection to the murder of a police officer.

Included in Hey Rube is a copy of a personal report written about Thompson during his time in the United States Air Force at Eglin Air Force Base in Florida.  It requests that he be reassigned duties and advises that Thompson should not do any unauthorized writing or accept outside employment with local media.  Thompson also includes a personal political statement and an “Honor Roll” which includes the names of such figures as Johnny Depp, Fidel Castro, Al Gore, and Anita Thompson.

The title is taken from the 19th century slogan "Hey, Rube!", a slang term of circus folk used to rally other carnies to their aid during a fight with a patron from the local town. Thompson elaborates in the introduction on the meaning of the term and the zeitgeist of old-fashioned circuses from the golden era that spawned the term.

Included articles 

Part One
 The New Dumb
 The Fix Is In
 Welcome to Generation Z
 The White House Disease
 Get Ready for Sainthood
 The Xmas Vice
 The Curse of Musburger
 Cruel Twist in the Coaching Business
 The NFL Sucks…Another League Bites the Dust…Rich Kids with Weapons
 Slow Week for Sports, in Politics
 Lynching in Denver
 Mad Cow Disease Comes to the NBA
 Death in the Afternoon
 XFL, R.I.P.
 The Most Horrible Curse in Sports
 Urgent Warning to Gamblers: Beware the Ideas of March
 I Told You It Was Wrong
 Where Were You When the Fun Stopped?
 Running Away with the Circus
 NBA and the Downward Spiral of Dumbness
 Bad Craziness at Owl Farm
 Can the Three Stooges Save the NBA?
 Kentucky Derby and Other Gambling Disasters
 Quitting the Gambling Business While I’m Ahead
 The Most Dangerous Sport of All
 Patrick Roy and Warren Zevon- Two Champions at the Top of Their Game
 Wild Days at the Sports Desk
 Eerie Lull Rattles the Sports World
 Olympic Disaster in Utah
 The Wisdom of Nashville and the Violence of Jack Nicholson- A Football Story
Part Two
 Fear and Loathing in America: The Beginning of the End
 When War Drums Roll
 Will Sports Survive Bin Laden?
 Stadium Living in the New Age
 Football in the Kingdom of Fear
 Foul Balls and Rash Predictions
 Getting Weird for Devil’s Day
 The Yankees are Dead: Long Live the Yankees
 The Man Who Loved Sport Too Much
 The Shame of Indianapolis
 Failure, Football, and Violence on the Strip
 Madness in Honolulu
 Break Up the Ravens
 Pay Up or Get Whipped
 Getting Braced for the Last Football Game
 Sodomized at the Airport: Are Terrorists Seizing Control of the NFL? And Who Let It Happen?
 Slow Dance in Rap Town
 Dr. Thompson in Beirut
 Dr. Thompson Is Back from Beirut
 The NFL: We Will March on a Road of Bones
Part Three
 A Wild and Wooly Tale of Sporting Excess
 My 49er Habit
 Don’t Let This Happen to You
 Grantland Rice Haunts the Honolulu Marathon
 Honolulu Marathon is Decadent and Depraved
 Public Shame and Private Victory
 Shooting the Moon with the Raiders
 The Last Super Bowl
 Extreme Behavior in Aspen
 Billionaire Swine and Kiwi Catastrophe
 Fleeced by Ed Bradley
 Love Blooms in the Rockies
 Love in a Time of War
 A Sad Week in America
 The Doomed Prefer Oakland
 The Tragedy of Naked Bowling
 West Coast Offense
 Great Fleecing in Woody Creek: Lakers Staggered in Series Opener
 The Sport of Kings
 The Good, the Bad, and the Vicious
 Rewarding the Ugly
 Killed by a Speeding Hummer
 When in Doubt, Bet the Dark Side
 Welcome to the Big Darkness
 The Nation’s Capital
 Speed Kills and Other Football Wisdom
 Nightmare in Hollywood
 Speed Will Rule the NFL This Year
 The Bush League
 Boxing Sucks
 George Plimpton
 Victory
 Wisdom
Honor Role

External links 
 Thompson’s Hey Rube articles archived at ESPN.com

2004 non-fiction books
Essay collections by Hunter S. Thompson
Simon & Schuster books